Duško Todorović (born May 19, 1994) is a Serbian mixed martial artist who competes in the Middleweight division of the Ultimate Fighting Championship (UFC).

Background
Todorović started training taekwondo around the age of eight, continuing until his late teens. He would also pick up wrestling and grappling along the way and after faring well in all disciplines, Todorović started training mixed martial arts around the age of 16. Todorović attended the Informational Technologies School at the University of Belgrade, where he graduated with a thesis about Organization of Business Systems.

Mixed martial arts career

Early career
Going 10-0 as an amateur, Todorović made his professional debut in 2015 under the Serbian Battle Championship banner, where he would spend most off his pre-UFC career. During his time there, Todorović took on and defeated the likes off DWCS alumni Alexander Poppeck and future UFC welterweight Michel Pereira, giving Pereira the only KO loss of his career to that point.

Dana White's Contender Series
Todorović was invited to participate on Dana White's Contender Series 26 on August 27, 2019 against Teddy Ash. Todorović won the bout in convincing fashion via unanimous decision and earned a contract to the UFC.

Ultimate Fighting Championship
Most of his 2020 were spent trying to arrange a UFC debut against John Phillips but this contest was cancelled three times due to the COVID-19 pandemic. Todorović was scheduled to face Phillips on 21 March 2020 at UFC Fight Night: Woodley vs. Edwards. Due to the COVID-19 pandemic travel bans, the bout was moved to Cage Warriors 113 but was later on removed from the card due to Todorović's travel restrictions. Todorović was expected to face Phillips on 16 July 2020 at UFC Fight Night: Kattar vs. Ige. On 8 July Todorović pulled out due to a potential medical issue.

Todorović finally made his UFC debut against Dequan Townsend on October 4, 2020 at UFC on ESPN: Holm vs. Aldana. He won the fight via technical knockout in round two. This win earned him the Performance of the Night bonus.

Todorović faced fellow DWCS alumni Punahele Soriano on January 16, 2021 at UFC on ABC: Holloway vs. Kattar. He lost for the first time in his career, getting TKO'd by Soriano at the end of the first round.

As the last fight of his contract, Todorović was scheduled to face Maki Pitolo on June 5, 2021 at UFC Fight Night: Rozenstruik vs. Sakai. However, two weeks ahead of the bout, Pitolo had to pull out due to unknown reasons and was replaced by Gregory Rodrigues. He lost the bout via unanimous decision.

The bout between Pitolo and Todorović was rescheduled on December 4, 2021 at UFC on ESPN 31. He won the fight via technical knockout in round one.

Todorović faced Chidi Njokuani on May 21, 2022 at UFC Fight Night 206. He lost the fight via knockout in round one.

Todorović faced Jordan Wright on October 15, 2022, at UFC Fight Night 212. He won the fight via technical knockout in round two. This fight earned him the Fight of the Night award.

Todorović faced Christian Leroy Duncan on March 18, 2023 at UFC 286. He lost the fight via technical knockout after a knee injury rendered him unable to continue in round one.

Championships and accomplishments

Mixed martial arts 

 Ultimate Fighting Championship
 Performance of the Night (One time) 
Fight of the Night (One time) 
 Serbian Battle Championship
 SBC Middleweight Championship (One time)

Mixed martial arts record

|-
|Loss
|align=center|12-4
|Christian Leroy Duncan
|TKO (knee injury)
|UFC 286
|
|align=center|1
|align=center|1:52
|London, England
|-
|Win
|align=center|12–3
|Jordan Wright
|TKO (punches and elbows)
|UFC Fight Night: Grasso vs. Araújo
|
|align=center|2
|align=center|3:12
|Las Vegas, Nevada, United States
|
|-
|Loss
|align=center|11–3
|Chidi Njokuani
|KO (elbow)
|UFC Fight Night: Holm vs. Vieira
|
|align=center|1
|align=center|4:48
|Las Vegas, Nevada, United States
|
|-
|Win
|align=center|11–2
|Maki Pitolo
|TKO (punches)
|UFC on ESPN: Font vs. Aldo 
|
|align=center|1
|align=center|4:34
|Las Vegas, Nevada, United States
|
|-
|Loss
|align=center|10–2
|Gregory Rodrigues
|Decision (unanimous)
|UFC Fight Night: Rozenstruik vs. Sakai
|
|align=center|3
|align=center|5:00
|Las Vegas, Nevada, United States
|
|-
| Loss
| align=center|10–1
| Punahele Soriano
| TKO (punches)
| UFC on ABC: Holloway vs. Kattar
| 
| align=center| 1
| align=center| 4:48
| Abu Dhabi, United Arab Emirates
| 
|-
| Win
| align=center|10–0
| Dequan Townsend
|TKO (punches)
|UFC on ESPN: Holm vs. Aldana
|
|align=center|2
|align=center|3:15
|Abu Dhabi, United Arab Emirates
|
|-
| Win
| align=center|9–0
| Teddy Ash
| Decision (unanimous)
|Dana White's Contender Series 26
|
|align=center|3
|align=center|5:00
|Las Vegas, Nevada, United States
| 
|-
| Win
| align=center|8–0
| Michel Pereira
| TKO (punches)
| Serbian Battle Championship 19
| 
| align=center| 1
| align=center| 4:32
| Novi Sad, Serbia
| 
|-
| Win
| align=center|7–0
| Kazuo Takahashi
|TKO (punches)
|Rings: The Outsider 51
|
|align=center| 1
|align=center| 1:41
|Kawasaki, Japan
|
|-
| Win
| align=center|6–0
|Shota Gvasalia
|TKO (arm injury)
|Collision Fighting League 3
|
|align=center|2
|align=center|2:11
|Belgrade, Serbia
|
|-
| Win
| align=center|5–0
|Alexander Poppeck
| Submission (rear-naked choke)
| Final Fight Championship 30
| 
| align=center| 2
| align=center| 4:52
| Linz, Austria
| 
|-
| Win
| align=center| 4–0
| Albert Micura
|TKO (punches)
|Serbian Battle Championship 9
|
|align=center|2
|align=center|1:09
|Odžaci, Serbia
|
|-
| Win
| align=center|3–0
| Toni Markulev
|TKO (punches)
|Naissus Fighting Championship 2
|
| align=center|2
| align=center|1:54
|Niš, Serbia
|
|-
| Win
| align=center| 2–0
| František Boban
| Submission (armbar)
|Fight of Gladiators: Night of Champions 2
|
| align=center|1
| align=center|1:37
|Trnava, Slovakia
|
|-
| Win
| align=center|1–0
| Srđan Knežević
| Submission (guillotine choke)
|Serbian Battle Championship 6
|
|align=center|1
|align=center|0:44
|Kać, Serbia
|

See also 
 List of current UFC fighters
 List of male mixed martial artists

References

External links 
  
 

Serbian male mixed martial artists
Middleweight mixed martial artists
Mixed martial artists utilizing taekwondo
Mixed martial artists utilizing Brazilian jiu-jitsu
Ultimate Fighting Championship male fighters
Serbian male taekwondo practitioners
Serbian practitioners of Brazilian jiu-jitsu
People awarded a black belt in Brazilian jiu-jitsu
1994 births
Living people
People from Kotor